Benjamin Anthony Brereton (born 18 April 1999), commonly known as Ben Brereton Díaz, is a professional footballer who plays as a striker for  club Blackburn Rovers and the Chile national team. 

Brereton Díaz began his club career with Nottingham Forest, making his senior debut in 2017. He moved to Blackburn in 2018, initially on loan before joining them on a permanent transfer in 2019.

Born in England, Brereton Díaz represented his birth country at the under-19 and under-20 levels, before being named in the Chile squad for the 2021 Copa América in Brazil, having qualified for the latter through his mother.

Early life
Brereton Díaz was born in Stoke-on-Trent, Staffordshire and attended Blythe Bridge High School. He was born to Martin Brereton, an English policeman and former amateur football player in Stoke-on-Trent area and District Sunday League, and Andrea Brereton, born in Concepción, Chile, who worked at Churchill China.

Club career

Early career
From the ages of seven to 14 Brereton Díaz was in the youth set-up at Manchester United. In 2013, he moved to his hometown club, Stoke City.

Nottingham Forest
Brereton Díaz signed with Championship club Nottingham Forest in the summer of 2015 after his release from Stoke City. Following his impressive form in the club's academy teams, with 15 goals in 20 appearances, he signed a new contract with the club on 31 December 2016. Brereton Díaz made his first-team debut for Forest on 25 January 2017 as a 76th-minute substitute during a 2–0 loss to Leeds United. He scored his first goal on 4 February, netting in injury-time against Aston Villa to give Forest a 2–1 victory.

On 27 March 2017, having made ten appearances and scoring against Fulham and Brentford, Brereton Díaz was nominated for the Championship Apprentice of the Year award. He was one of three players nominated, the others named as Lloyd Kelly of Bristol City and Sheffield Wednesday's George Hirst. Brereton Díaz was announced as the winner at the EFL Awards at the Hilton Hotel, Park Lane, on 9 April. He signed a long-term contract with Forest on 22 June 2017, keeping him under contract at the club until June 2021.

Blackburn Rovers
On 28 August 2018, Brereton Díaz signed for Blackburn Rovers on loan, with a view to making the transfer permanent in the January 2019 transfer window. On 4 January 2019, the move was made permanent for an undisclosed fee, believed to be £7m. Blackburn Rovers hold the option of an extra one year on his contract, which if triggered, would keep him at the club until 2023. After scoring six goals in just five matches, including a hat-trick against Cardiff City, Brereton Díaz was awarded the Championship Player of the Month award for September 2021.

After the best season of his career, scoring twenty-two goals as Blackburn finished 8th, six points outside the play-off positions, Blackburn triggered a contract extension for Brereton Díaz.

International career
Born in England to a Chilean mother, Brereton Díaz was eligible to play for both nations. He played age-group games for England but switched allegiances to Chile, making his senior debut in 2021.

England
In March 2017, Brereton Díaz received his first call-up to an England side after being named in the under-19s squad for games against their Spanish, Norwegian and Belarusian counterparts. Having started his side's 3–0 defeat of Spain and coming off the bench for the 5–1 beating of Belarus, manager Keith Downing praised his performances and ease at settling into the squad.

Brereton Díaz was subsequently called up to represent England at the 2017 UEFA European Under-19 Championship. In the group stage, he scored the winner against the Netherlands and twice against Germany. Brereton Díaz was a second-half substitute during the victory against Portugal in the final. His total of three goals meant Brereton Díaz was joint top goalscorer at the tournament. Brereton Díaz also played at the 2018 UEFA European Under-19 Championship, scoring his only goal of the tournament in the opening group stage match against Turkey.

Chile
After noticing he was half Chilean whilst playing Football Manager, a group of fans began a social media campaign to get Brereton Díaz picked for Chile. This was subsequently picked up by the national media and on 24 May 2021, Brereton Díaz was called up to the Chile squad for the first time by manager Martín Lasarte for the 2022 FIFA World Cup qualifiers against Argentina and Bolivia. He was subsequently included in Chile's squad for 2021 Copa América and on 14 June made his debut for Chile when he came off the bench against Argentina in a 1–1 draw. On 18 June, he was handed his first start as he scored his first international goal for La Roja, against Bolivia in a 1–0 win.

Personal life
Brereton Díaz first started using the name Ben Brereton Díaz when he debuted for Chile, as Spanish names use both the father's surname and mother's surname. He then announced in July 2021 he would use the name at club level as well. Since playing for the national side, Brereton Díaz said he has been taking Spanish lessons three times a week and learning about the national anthem.

Career statistics

Club

International

As of match played 27 January 2022. Chile score listed first, score column indicates score after each Brereton goal.

Honours
England U19
UEFA European Under-19 Championship: 2017

Individual
UEFA European Under-19 Championship Golden Boot: 2017
EFL Championship Apprentice of the Year: 2016–17
EFL Championship Player of the Month: September 2021
Blackburn Rovers Players' Player of the Year: 2021–22
Junior Rovers Player of the Year: 2021–22
Chilean Footballer of the Year: 2022
PFA Team of the Year: 2021–22 Championship

References

External links
 
 

1999 births
Living people
English people of Chilean descent
Sportspeople of Chilean descent
Chilean people of English descent
Footballers from Stoke-on-Trent
Chilean footballers
English footballers
Association football forwards
Nottingham Forest F.C. players
Blackburn Rovers F.C. players
English Football League players
England youth international footballers
Chile international footballers
2021 Copa América players
Citizens of Chile through descent
Naturalized citizens of Chile